Maba Diakhou Bâ (1809 – July 1867), also known as Ma Ba Diakhu, Ma Ba Diakho Ba, Ma Ba Jaaxu, Mabba Jaxu Ba, was a Muslim leader in West Africa during the 19th century. Born in Rip, Maba was a disciple of the Tijaniyya Sufi brotherhood and became the Almami of Saloum.

A descendant of the Fulani Denianke Dynasty, from the branch of the Bâ family in the region of Badibou, Maba Diakhou Bâ combined political and religious goals in an attempt to reform or overthrow previous animist monarchies, and resist French encroachment.  He is in a tradition of Fulani jihad leaders who revolutionized the states of West Africa at the time of colonialism.

Maba Diakhou Bâ founded the city of Nioro in Rip. The village of Keur Maba Diakhou near Kaolack is named for him.

Resistance and conquest
Maba Diakhou Bâ mounted a fierce resistance to the French colonial invasions of Senegal.  Under governor Faidherbe French forces had carried out a scorched-earth policy against resistance to their expansion in the Senegambia, with villages razed and populations removed after each victory. Throughout the founding of an Islamic state, Maba Diakhou Bâ tried to unify the area north of the Gambia, while leading a war of conversion against the traditional states.

After meeting El Hadj Umar Tall around 1850, Maba Diakhou Bâ launched his jihad into Serer territory from his small state of Rip in 1861.  While he eventually succeeded in overtaking the dynasty of Saloum, his movement never succeeded in Sine, and much of Serer territory remained animist or Christian into the 20th century.  There is much to suggest that Sine resistance was as much nationalist as religious, with Muslims and animists fighting on both sides of these struggles.

Battle of Rip (1865)
On 30 November 1865, with the help of Lat Dior and his Cayor forces, Maba Diakhou Bâ began the conquest of the states of Sine, Baol and Djolof.

Siege of Kaolack (1865)
Later at Kaolack, Maba and Lat Dior were checked by a combined force of French under Pinet-Laprade of 2000 cavalry and 4000 colonial infantry, allied with 1000 infantry and 500 cavalry from the states of Waalo, Ndiambour and Ndiander.

Islamization and reform
As well as converting traditional states to Islam, Maba Diakhou Bâ's forces sought to abolish the traditional caste system of the Wolof and Serer aristocratic states. In unifying with other Muslim forces, West African Jihad states aimed to end the reign of small regional kingships who kept the area in a constant state of war, and the farming and artisanal classes in slave conditions. The Toucouleur Empire of El Hadj Umar Tall in Mali, which rose at about the same time had much the same goals, and Umar Tall himself was in contact with and recruited among Maba Diakhou Bâ's forces.

Lat Dior
After Lat Dior, the young king of Wolof Cayor was defeated by the French at the Battle of Loro (1864), Maba Diakhou Bâ offered him asylum, and converted Dior and his soldiers from the traditional Tièddo animism to Islam. While his conversion may have been for reasons more political than spiritual, Lat Dior became a powerful ally even in exile, leading his forces alongside those of Sine.

In 1867, Lat Dior and Maba Diakhou Bâ reconquered Cayor from the king placed there by the French. Governor Pinet-Laprade had little choice but to accede to Lat Dior, confirming him as the French chef de canton.

Death and legacy

In 1867, Maba Diakhou Bâ was killed leading forces against the animist Serer state of Maad a Sinig Kumba Ndoffene Famak Joof. By 1871, the Serer had re-instated their traditional monarchy, which was soon to be supplanted by the French.

Maba Diakhou Bâ is an important link in the tradition of Senegalese marabouts who trace their lineage to Umar Tall.  This tradition has continued to the present, with such notables as El Hadj Saidou Nourou Tall (the former grand marabout of French West Africa) the Tivaouane-based Sy family of El Hadj Malik Sy (1855–1922), and the Niass family of Abdoulaye Niass (1840–1922) and his son Ibrahim Niass in Kaolack.  Tivaouane in the north among the Wolof and Kaolack among the Serer have become the two centers of Tijaniyyah Sufi teaching in Senegal, and both were founded as a direct result of Maba Diakhou Bâ's short-lived state.

He was interred in the village of Fandène (or Mbel Fandane), and his tomb, which has become a place of pilgrimage, is in the Diakhao Arrondissement, département of Fatick in Sine-Saloum, Sénégal.

See also
 Maad a Sinig Kumba Ndoffene Famak Joof
 The Battle of Fandane-Thiouthioune
 Muslim brotherhoods of Senegal
 The Tijaniyyah Expansion in West Africa

References

 Translation of Fr:Wikipedia.
 Tidiane N’Diaye, MEMOIRE D’ERRANCE.
 Lat Dior, Le Kayor, l'impossible defi.
 Site officiel du Sénégal.
 Joseph Hill. Màbba Jaxu Ba and Islamic Revolution, 4 March 2006.

Bibliography
  L’épopée de Maba Diakhou Ba du Rip, mémoire de maîtrise, Dakar, Université de Dakar, Faculté des Lettres et Sciences humaines, Département de Lettres modernes, 1996. Mbaye, A. K.
 
  Maba Diakhou Ba dans le Rip et le Saloum (1861–1867), mémoire de maîtrise, Dakar, Université de Dakar, 1970. Keita, Kélétigui S.
  Atlas du Sénégal, par Iba Der Thiam et Mbaye Guèye, édition Jeune Afrique, 2000.
 Ginette Ba-Curry, In Search of Maba: A 19th Century Epic from Senegambia, West Africa (Preface of the Play by Edris Makward, Emeritus Professor of African Literature, Univ of Wisconsin, USA), Phoenix Press International, Maryland, 2011 [Category: Drama].

1809 births
1867 deaths
People from Kaolack Region
Fula people
Senegalese Muslims
Senegalese religious leaders
History of Senegal
Tijaniyyah order